Elkhart Christian Academy is a private Christian school serving grades pre-K through high school. It is located in Elkhart, Indiana.

See also
 List of high schools in Indiana

References

External links
 Official Website

Christian schools in Indiana
Private high schools in Indiana
Buildings and structures in Elkhart County, Indiana